Dalit literature is literature written by Dalits about their lives. Dalit literature exists in several Indian languages, including Marathi, Bangla, Hindi, Kannada, Punjabi, Sindhi, and Tamil, through narratives such as poems, short stories, and autobiographies, which stood out due to their stark portrayal of reality and the Dalit political scene.

Dalit literature denounced the then-prevailing portrayal of life by mainstream Marathi literature.

Early Dalit literature
One of the first Dalit writers was Madara Chennaiah, an 11th-century cobbler-saint who lived during the reign of the Western Chalukyas and who is also regarded by some scholars as the "father of Vachana poetry". Another poet who finds mention is Dohara Kakkaiah, a Dalit by birth, whose six confessional poems survive.

The origins of Dalit writing can also be traced back to Buddhist literature, or to mainly  Marathi Dalit Bhakti poets like Gora, Chokha Mela and Karmamela, and to the Tamil Siddhas, or Chittars — many of whose hagiographies, in accounts such as the 12th-century Periyapuranam, suggest that they may have been Dalits. Modern Dalit writing only emerged as a distinct genre after the democratic and egalitarian thinkers such as Sree Narayana Guru, Jyotiba Phule, B.R. Ambedkar, Iyothee Thass, Sahodaran Ayyappan, Ayyankali, Poykayil Appachan, and others began to articulate the sources and modes of caste oppression.

Modern Dalit Literature 

According to Satyanarayana and Tharu, "although it is possible to identify a few Dalit writers from earlier times, the real originality and force of Dalit writing, which today comprises a substantial and growing body of work, can be traced to the decades following the late 1960s. Those are the years when the Dalit Panthers revisit and embrace the ideas of Babasaheb Ambedkar, and elaborate his disagreements with the essentially Gandhian mode of Indian nationalism, to begin a new social movement.In the following decades, Dalit writing becomes an all-India phenomenon. This writing reformulates the caste question and reassesses the significance of colonialism and of missionary activity. It resists the reduction of caste to class or to non-Brahminism and vividly describes and analyzes the contemporary workings of caste power."

Asserting the importance of Dalit literature, Arundhati Roy has observed: "I do believe that in India we practice a form of apartheid that goes unnoticed by the rest of the world. And it is as important for Dalits to tell their stories as it has been for colonized peoples to write their own histories. When Dalit literature has blossomed and is in full stride, then contemporary (upper caste?) Indian literature's amazing ability to ignore the true brutality and ugliness of the society in which we live, will be seen for what it is: bad literature." Jaydeep Sarangi, in his 2018 introduction to "Dalit Voice," writes that Dalit literature is a culture-specific upheaval in India giving importance to Dalit realization, aesthetics and resistance.

Dalit literature in Marathi language
Dalit literature originally emerged in the Marathi language as a literary response to the everyday oppressions of caste in mid-twentieth-century independent India, critiquing caste practices by experimenting with various literary forms. Subsequently, Dalit
literature emerged as a remarkable phenomenon in various Indian languages.
In 1958, the term "Dalit literature" was used at the first conference of Maharashtra Dalit Sahitya Sangha (Maharashtra Dalit Literature Society) in Mumbai 
Baburao Bagul's first collection of stories, Jevha Mi Jat Chorali (English When I had Concealed My Caste), published in 1963, depicted a cruel society and thus brought in a new momentum to Dalit literature in Marathi; today it is seen by many critics as an epic portraying lives of the Dalits, and was later made into a film by actor-director Vinay Apte. Gradually with other writers like, Namdeo Dhasal (who founded Dalit Panther), these Dalit writings paved way for the strengthening of Dalit movement.
Notable Dalit authors writing in Marathi include Arun Kamble, Shantabai Kamble, Raja Dhale, Namdev Dhasal, Daya Pawar, Annabhau Sathe, Laxman Mane, Laxman Gaikwad, Sharankumar Limbale, Bhau Panchbhai, Kishor Shantabai Kale, Narendra Jadhav, Shankar Rao Kharat, and
Urmila Pawar.Kharat served as president of the 1984 session of  Marathi Sahitya Sammelan (Marathi literary conference) held in Jalgaon.

Although the first Dalit literature conference was held in 1958 by newly converted buddhist writers, Annabhau Sathe, a communist, who turned to Ambedkarite movement in the later part of his life, is credited as the founding father of Dalit literature.

Dalit literature started being mainstream in India with the appearance of the English translations of Marathi Dalit writing. An Anthology of Dalit Literature, edited by Mulk Raj Anand and Eleanor Zelliot, and Poisoned Bread: Translations from Modern Marathi Dalit Literature, originally published in three volumes and later collected in a single volume, edited by Arjun Dangle, both published in 1992, were perhaps the first books that popularised the genre throughout India .

In 1993, Ambedkari Sahitya Parishad organized the first Akhil Bharatiya Ambedkari Sahitya Sammelan (All India Ambedkarite Literature Convention) in Wardha, Maharashtra] to re-conceptualize and transform Dalit literature into Ambedkari Sahitya, after the name of the Dalit modern-age hero, scholar and inspiration B.R. Ambedkar, who had successfully campaigned against caste-discrimination and was a strong advocate of Dalit rights. Ambedkari Sahitya Parishad then successfully organized the Third Akhil Bharatiya Ambedkari Sahitya Sammelan in 1996 and became a voice of advocacy for awareness and transformation. Since then ten similar literary gatherings, were held in various places.

See also
 Dalit studies
 Dalit music
 Dalit Writing from South India

Further reading
 Muthukkaruppan, Parthasarathi.(2018) " Preliminary Remarks on Dalit Poetry" Rethinking Marxism Vol.30 no.1 available at https://www.tandfonline.com/doi/abs/10.1080/08935696.2018.1456762?journalCode=rrmx20
 Aston, N.M. Ed. (2001) Dalit Literature and African-American Literature. New Delhi: Prestige Books. .
Chakraborty, Mridula Nath and MacCarter, Kent (2016) Issue 55.1: Dalit Indian and Indigenous Australian Cordite Poetry Review, full issue in translation.
 Dangle, Arjun (1992) Ed. Poisoned Bread: Translations from Modern Marathi Dalit Literature. Hyderabad: Orient Longman.
 Dasan, M. Pratibha, V. Chandrika, C.S. and Pradeepan Pampirikunnu (2012) Eds. The Oxford India Anthology of Malayalam Dalit Writing, OUP India
 Dutta, Angana and Sarangi, Jaydeep (2015) Trans. Eds. Surviving in My world: Growing up Dalit in Bengal. Kolkata: Stree-Samya.
 Sarangi, Jaydeep Ed. "Stories of Social Awakening:Jatin Bala", Authorspress, New Delhi, 2017
 Franco, Fernando, Macwan, Jyotsna & Ramanathan, Suguna (2004) Journeys to Freedom: Dalit Narratives. Bombay: Popular Prakashan. , .
 Limbale, Sharankumar. (2004) Towards an Aesthetic of Dalit Literature Orient Longman. .
Gonsalves, Roanna (2016) We Need to Talk about Caste: Roanna Gonsalves Interviews S Anand Cordite Poetry Review
 Manohar, D.Murali (2013) Ed.Critical Essays on Dalit Literature. New Delhi: Atlantic. .
 Manohar, D.Murali (2013) Ed. Dalit Hindu Narratives, New Delhi: Global, 2013. 
 Prasad, Amar Nath and Gaijan, M.B. (2007) Dalit Literature : A Critical Exploration. .
 Purushotham, K. (2013) Trans. and Ed. Black Lilies: Telugu Dalit Poetry New Delhi: Critical Quest.
Ravikumar and Azhagarasan, R (2012) Eds. The Oxford Anthology of Tamil Dalit Writing. New Delhi: OUP India. 
 Ravikumar (2009) Venomous Touch: Notes on Caste, Culture and Politics. Calcutta: Samaya
 Satyanarayana, K & Tharu, Susie (2011) No Alphabet in Sight: New Dalit Writing from South Asia, Dossier 1: Tamil and Malayalam, New Delhi: Penguin Books.
 Satyanarayana, K & Tharu, Susie (2013) From those Stubs Steel Nibs are Sprouting: New Dalit Writing from South Asia, Dossier 2: Kannada and Telugu, New Delhi: HarperCollins India.
 Satyanarayana, K and Tharu, Susie (2013). The Exercise of Freedom: An Introduction to Dalit Writing. New Delhi: Navayana. p. 21. .
 Uma, Alladi. Rani, K. Suneetha. and Manohar, D. Murali. (2014) Eds. English in the Dalit Context. New Delhi: OrientBlackswan.
 Sarangi, Jaydeep , "An Interview with Arjun Dangle",Setu, United States.
 Sarangi, Jaydeep, "Dalit Feminist Activist Writes Back: Bama Faustina in Conversation with Jaydeep Sarangi" Writers in Conversation, Australia
 Sarangi, Jaydeep, "In Conversation with Kapilkrishna Thakur", Writers in Conversation, Australia
 Shalin Maria Lawrence (2019) Vadachennaikkaari: Urban Dalit Literature. a mixed genre essays: Chennai. .

References
Manohar, D.Murali. Priesthood: Theorizing Mala/Vaishnava Dasari's Life, Culture and History. New Delhi: Serials, 2016.
. Dalit Literature: A Pedagogic Discourse. New Delhi: Serials, 2016.

External links
 Excerpt from Arundhati Roy's essay, "The Doctor and the Saint"
 We Need Ambedkar Now: Arundhati Roy Interview
The Telegraph, 
 Voice of Dalit: https://www.amazon.in/Dalit-Voice-Literature-Sharankumar-Limbale/dp/B079DM7YRN
 https://www.justicenews.co.in/through-the-ceiling-of-silences/
 https://www.getbengal.com/home/story_detail/is-there-dalit-literature-in-bangla

 
Indian literature
Literature by topic